Lost Junction is a 2003 thriller film directed by Peter Masterson and written by Jeff Cole.

Plot 
A hitchhiking drifter (Billy Burke) has his life irrevocably changed when he meets a seductive young woman (Neve Campbell)  who lures him into disposing of the body of her husband.

Cast
Neve Campbell as Missy Lofton
Billy Burke as Jimmy McGee
Jake Busey as Matt
Charles Powell as Porter
David Gow as Sheriff Frank
Michel Perron as Shorty
Amy Sloan as Teller
Norman Mikeal Berketa as Mr. Thompson
Mariah Inger as Cassie

Home media
The region 1 DVD was released November 9, 2004.

References

External links

2003 films
2003 crime thriller films
2003 psychological thriller films
American neo-noir films
Films directed by Peter Masterson
Films scored by Normand Corbeil
2000s American films